The Hunter 19-2 is an American trailerable sailboat that was designed as a day sailer and small cruising sailboat by the Hunter Design Team and first built in 1993.

The design was originally marketed by the manufacturer as the Hunter 19, but is now usually referred to as the Hunter 19-2 to differentiate it from the unrelated 1981 Hunter 19-1 design, which was also sold as the Hunter 19.

Production
The design was built by Hunter Marine in the United States between 1993 and 1996, but it is now out of production.

Design
The Hunter 19-2 is a recreational keelboat, built predominantly of fiberglass, with positive flotation. It has a fractional sloop rig, a slightly raked stem, a walk-through reverse transom, a transom-hung kick-up rudder controlled by a tiller, a retractable centerboard and a flooding water ballast tank, which is drained for road transport.

The boat is normally fitted with a small  outboard motor for docking and maneuvering. The design features a self-bailing cockpit, built-in outboard engine mount, a portable toilet, portable stove and a cooler. A highway trailer was supplied as standard equipment.

The design has sleeping accommodation for two people, with a double berth in an aft cabin. The galley is located on the port side just forward of the companionway ladder. The galley is equipped with a stove and a sink. The head is located in the forepeak.

Operational history
In a 2010 review Steve Henkel wrote, "here is a boat that focuses on the relatively inexperienced sailor who seeks a vessel with certain characteristics: room down below; a modern streamlined look: easy trailerability; good affordability; and inclusion of all equipment and instrumentation required to go sailing so there's no need for endless trips to a marine store. Best features: Hunter hit their target market dead center. The boat is roomy ... has splashy hull decorations to lend a streamlined look; uses water ballast that can be drained before trailering, saving 600 pounds compared to comps: is priced for the budget-minded; and includes a 'Cruise Pac' with all gear needed, including a copy of Chapman's. Worst features: What the new sailor may not know is that he or she is getting a boat that is slow ... due to small sail area; tender (ie., tips easily) due to water ballast high up rather than lead or iron ballast down low ... and has a tendency to be blown sideways when the wind is abeam, limiting maneuverability under power, due to unusually high freeboard. The pity is that many of these owners think all sailboats have the faults they encounter, and just learn to live with them or quit sailing altogether."

See also
List of sailing boat types

Related development
Hunter 19-1

Similar sailboats
Hunter 23.5
Hunter 240
Hunter 260
Hunter 27 Edge
MacGregor 26

References

External links
Official brochure

Keelboats
1990s sailboat type designs
Sailing yachts
Trailer sailers
Sailboat type designs by Hunter Design Team
Sailboat types built by Hunter Marine